The Grand Tower (formerly Tower 2) is a high-rise in the Europaviertel quarter in Frankfurt, Germany. The tower is located next to the Skyline-Plaza shopping center. The developer states the total investment at around 250 million euros.

The Grand Tower is considered to be the first high-rise residential building in Germany to be marketed globally; with the Asian, Arab and North American markets being the main focus.

References

External links

Skyscrapers in Frankfurt
Residential skyscrapers in Germany